Habib Boromand Dashghapu (born 1961) is an Iranian Shiite cleric and politician.

Boromand was born in Germi, Ardabil province. He is a member of the 3rd and 9th Islamic Consultative Assembly from the electorate of Parsabad and Bilesavar. Boromand won with 43,416 (36.22%) votes.
he won 4th parliament election but he'd banned from parliament because of having picture in Berlins public places.(in Islam its guilt).

References

People from Germi
Deputies of Parsabad and Bilesavar
Living people
1961 births
Islamic Azad University, Central Tehran Branch alumni
Members of the 9th Islamic Consultative Assembly
Members of the 3rd Islamic Consultative Assembly